General Oliver Nicolls (c.1740 – 1829) was a British Army officer.

Military career
Nicolls was commissioned into the 1st Regiment of Foot in November 1756. He became Quartermaster-General in the West Indies in 1794, in which capacity he subdued a rebellion in Grenada. He became Commander-in-chief of the Bombay Army on 22 January 1801 retiring from that post in 1808 to become a member of the Board of Inquiry into the Convention of Sintra under which the defeated French were allowed to evacuate their troops from Portugal without further conflict. He went on to serve as Governor of the Island of Anholt in 1813.

He was also colonel of the 54th Regiment of Foot and then the 66th Regiment of Foot.

References

 

|-

|-

1740 births
1829 deaths
Commanders-in-chief of Bombay